Matan Zohar (born 30 April 1990), better known by his stage name Mat Zo, is a British producer and DJ. Zohar released his debut album, Damage Control, via the Anjunabeats and Astralwerks labels on 5 November 2013. His second studio album, Self Assemble, was released on 25 March 2016 under his own Mad Zoo label.

Early life
The son of artist Israel Zohar, and half-brother of Israeli singer Alma Zohar, Matan Zohar was born in London on 30 April 1990 and lived in Ohio until the age of eleven before returning to his birthland. He was raised by his mother, Wendy Caron Zohar, a professional violinist who nurtured Matan's early love of and inclination toward music. His father, who was a Kazakhstan-born painter, gifted him a guitar at the age of eight which eventually shifted to him forming musical bands and playing with drums and bass. Zohar began to explore electronic music in his teens by self-learning music production with Logic Pro and taking inspiration from artists like The Chemical Brothers and Daft Punk.

Career
Mat's releases on Anjunabeats have earned substantial critical acclaim, and his collaboration with Porter Robinson, "Easy", reached number eleven on the US Dance Club Songs chart, and number one on Beatport.

On 28 August 2013, Mat Zo announced the title and artwork for his debut album Damage Control as well as a teaser track called "Little Damage". Damage Control was released on 5 November of that year. It garnered immediate critical acclaim and established Mat as an extremely versatile artist who could produce electronic music of all types and genres. Dancing Astronaut called it "an inspiring and timeless artistic debut". The album went on to be nominated for a Grammy Award for Best Dance/Electronic Album.

On 25 March 2016, Mat Zo released his second studio album titled Self Assemble, which he speculated to be his "farewell to the [EDM] industry" due to his disenchantment with the EDM scene as of 2015. "This album is sort of my last send-off before I go and do other things in life. It feels like I’m ready to go and venture off into other realms," stated Mat Zo to Billboard. As of January 2017, Mat Zo appeared to have changed his mind about retiring due to a "renewed sense of vigor and passion", and continues to tour and produce with his main name in addition to two new collectives; Kill The Zo with Kill The Noise and The Mary Nixons with The Knocks.

His earlier drum and bass productions are under the pseudonym MRSA on Hospital Records. He also has several unreleased tracks under the MRSA moniker playable through his Myspace account. Mat has also continued to produce occasional drum and bass releases under his current name, such as "Games" for UKF10 and "Blessed Be Thy Name" for This Is MAD TOO.

Mat Zo revealed through a Reddit "Ask-Me-Anything" on 6 July 2018 that he was working on a third studio album. He returned to Anjunabeats in the same year with the release of his No Words EP, ending his five year hiatus from the label. Mat Zo's "classic" trance and progressive sound within the EP were praised by critics. Mat Zo released his third album, Illusion of Depth, through Anjunabeats in 2020. In 2021, his song "Colours (feat. Olan)" was featured in the racing video game Forza Horizon 5.

Mad Zoo Records
Following the establishment of his own label Mad Zoo in August 2014, Mat Zo has focused his efforts onto expanding his label and creating a platform for upcoming artists. The first compilation on Mad Zoo, This Is Mad Zoo was released on 5 July 2019, which included 12 tracks from various artists including Mat Zo, himself.  The second compilation, entitled This Is Mad Too, was released exclusively on Beatport on 20 January, and on all other major streaming platforms on 24 January 2020. This Is Mad Too includes a total of 17 tracks from Mat Zo, Tsuruda, Rohaan, Acrillics, Gladez, Anti.Negative and others. A release party for the compilation was hosted by Bass Waffles in Highland Park, Los Angeles, on 26 January.

Discography

Studio albums
 Damage Control (2013)
 Self Assemble (2016)
 Illusion of Depth (2020)

Awards and nominations

Grammy Awards

|-
| 2015
| Damage Control
|rowspan="1"| Best Dance/Electronic Album
| 
|-

See also

List of music artists and bands from London

References

External links
Mat Zo official website

British people of Kazakh descent
English DJs
English electronic musicians
English record producers
1990 births
Living people
English people of Kazakhstani descent
English people of Israeli descent
Musicians from London
English trance musicians
Electronic dance music DJs
Anjunabeats artists
Armada Music artists
Astralwerks artists